Carey L. Lloyd (July 4, 1933 – November 13, 1993), also known by his ring name Rufus R. "Freight Train" Jones, was an American professional wrestler who competed in the Central States, St.Louis and Mid-Atlantic regional promotions of the National Wrestling Alliance as well as the American Wrestling Association and All Japan Pro Wrestling during the 1970s and 1980s.

Early life
Lloyd grew up in Dillon, South Carolina and attended South Carolina State University, where he played on the football team. He also got involved with boxing and competed as a Golden Gloves boxer.

Professional wrestling career
Lloyd trained to become a wrestler at the Tony Santos Boston Wrestling School. At the beginning of his career, he used the ring name Buster Lloyd, the Harlem Hangman. He claimed to have learned how to fight on the corner of Lenox Avenue and 125th Street in Harlem. In this gimmick, he wrestled in Texas and criticized the local wrestlers as being inferior fighters to someone who grew up on the streets. He feuded with Tiger Conway, Sr., who emerged the victor in the feud.

He made his professional wrestling debut in 1968 working in Eastern Canada for Grand Prix Wrestling in the Maritimes and International Wrestling in Montreal. In 1969 he wrestled in Japan for Japan Pro Wrestling Alliance. Lloyd later adopted the ring name of Rufus R. Jones, nicknamed "Freight Train". In interviews, he would tell opponents that his middle initial, R, stood for "guts". He formed a tag team with Burrhead Jones, who was billed as his cousin.

Jones moved to Missouri in 1970 to wrestle, where he worked for promoter Sam Muchnick in the St. Louis Wrestling Club. He also competed for Heart of America Sports/Central States Wrestling. In 1971, he won his first championship by teaming with Steve Bolus to win the Central States version of the NWA North American Tag Team Championship. He later won the belt twice more, teaming with The Stomper and Bob Geigel. Between 1972 and 1982 he worked for All Japan Pro Wrestling. He also had a short stint in Florida briefly feuding with Leroy Brown in the early 80s.  During the year of 1989, Jones traveled to Puerto Rico to wrestle in the World Wrestling Council ( Capitol Sports Promotion ).

Personal life
Lloyd was married to Brooksie Jones Lloyd. They had three daughters, Melaney, Crystal, and Kendall, as well as a son, Kenneth Johnson, who worked for the World Wrestling Federation for many years as "The Doctor of Style" Slick. After his retirement from wrestling, Carey Lloyd worked with Bob Geigel in security at a dog-racing track in Kansas City, Kansas. He then opened a restaurant named Rufus' Ringside Restaurant and Bar in Kansas City, Missouri.

On November 13, 1993, Lloyd died of a heart attack while hunting deer in Brunswick, Missouri.

Championships and accomplishments 
Central States Wrestling
NWA Central States Heavyweight Championship (2 times)
NWA Central States Tag Team Championship (3 times) – with Bob Brown (1 time), Dewey Robertson (1 time), and Mike George (1 time)
NWA Central States Television Championship (1 time)
NWA North American Tag Team Championship (Central States version) (4 times) – with Steve Bolus (1 time), The Stomper (1 time), and Bob Geigel (2 times)
Georgia Championship Wrestling
NWA Georgia Tag Team Championship (1 time) – with Norvell Austin
Mid-Atlantic Championship Wrestling
NWA Mid-Atlantic Heavyweight Championship (1 time)
NWA Mid-Atlantic Tag Team Championship (1 time) – with Bugsy McGraw
NWA Mid-Atlantic Television Championship (2 times)
NWA World Tag Team Championship (Mid-Atlantic version) (1 time) – with Wahoo McDaniel
 Professional wrestling
World Negro Heavyweight Championship (1 time)
Pro Wrestling Illustrated
PWI ranked him # 477 of the 500 best singles wrestlers of the PWI Years in 2003
Pro Wrestling This Week
Wrestler of the Week (November 1–7, 1987)
Southeastern Championship Wrestling
NWA Alabama Heavyweight Championship (1 time)
WWE
WWE Hall of Fame (Class of 2018)

References

Further reading
Flair, Ric. Ric Flair: To Be the Man. New York: Simon & Schuster, 2004. 
Race, Harley and Gerry Tritz. King Of The Ring: The Harley Race Story. Champaigne, Illinois: Sports Publishing LLC, 2004. 
 Shoot with Slick.  Perf. Ken Johnson. DVD. Highspots.com, 2006.

External links
The Way It Was: Rufus R. Jones by Percival A. Friend
Rufus R. Jones: The 'R' Stood For 'Guts' by Mike Mooneyham
Black History Month: Pro Wrestling's Black Stars, Part 3 by Denny Burkholder
Championship Wrestling from Florida: Rufus R. Jones

 
 

1933 births
1993 deaths
20th-century American male actors
African-American male professional wrestlers
American male professional wrestlers
NWA/WCW World Television Champions
Professional wrestlers from South Carolina
WWE Hall of Fame Legacy inductees
People from Dillon, South Carolina
20th-century professional wrestlers
NWA Florida Bahamian Champions
WCW World Tag Team Champions
NWA Georgia Tag Team Champions